Gainsthorpe  is a deserted medieval village  (DMV) site in a field which is part of the present Gainsthorpe Farm in Lincolnshire, England.

It is now in the care of English Heritage. There is a small car park from where a footpath of about  leads to the site. The typical medieval layout of sunken roads and raised rectangular tofts and crofts is clearly seen in the humps and hollows of the field.

References

External links

History, research and visiting information:English Heritage

Deserted medieval villages in Lincolnshire
Tourist attractions in Lincolnshire
English Heritage sites in Lincolnshire
Archaeological sites in Lincolnshire